Three Chord Revolution is an album by Ann Beretta, released in 2003.

Critical reception
AllMusic called Three Chord Revolution "a fine, modern-day punk rock album." The Richmond Times-Dispatch called it "fast and furious rock, a little on the punk side, with the same knack for a good pop melody as legendary acts like the Ramones and the Clash."

Track listing
"Not Invited"
"New Revolution"
"Built To Last"
"Lipstick & Makeup"
"Picture Perfect World"
"Angry All The Time"
"Better Half"
"Lost In You"
"Until You Be Mine"
"Fallout"
"Has Been Lullaby"
"Long Road Home"

References

Ann Beretta albums
2003 albums